The fourth season of Frasier originally aired from September 17, 1996, to May 20, 1997, on NBC, consisting a total of 24 episodes.

Cast

Main
 Kelsey Grammer as Frasier Crane
 Jane Leeves as Daphne Moon
 David Hyde Pierce as Niles Crane
 Peri Gilpin as Roz Doyle
 Dan Butler as Bulldog
 John Mahoney as Martin Crane

Special guest
Robert Prosky as T.H. Houghton
Marsha Mason as Sherry
Patricia Wettig as Stephanie
James Earl Jones as Norman
Bebe Neuwirth as Lilith
Linda Hamilton as Laura

Special appearance by
Bobby Sherman as himself

Recurring
Edward Hibbert as Gil Chesterton

Guest
Trevor Einhorn as Frederick
Jane Lynch as Cynthia
Jane Kaczmarek as Maureen
Željko Ivanek as Dr. Arnold Shaw
Lisa Darr as Laura
Megan Mullally as Beth
Rosemary Murphy as Carol Larkin
Lois Smith as Moira
Harriet Sansom Harris as Bebe Glazer
Kathryn Joosten as Vera
Patrick Kerr as Noel Shempsky
Pauley P. as Waitress
Scott Atkinson as Clive

Episodes

References 

1996 American television seasons
1997 American television seasons
Frasier 04